Father of Four in the City is a 1956 Danish family-comedy film directed by Alice O'Fredericks, and starring Karl Stegger, Birgitte Bruun and Peter Malberg.

Cast
 Karl Stegger as Far
 Birgitte Bruun as Søs
 Otto Møller Jensen as Ole
 Rudi Hansen as Mie
 Ole Neumann as Lille Per
 Peter Malberg as Onkel Anders
 Ib Mossin as Peter Mortensen
 Ebbe Langberg as Erik Holm
 Agnes Rehni as Naboen Agnes Sejersen
 Einar Juhl as Rektor
 Holger Juul Hansen as Lærer
 Kirsten Passer as Lærerinde Ludvigsen
 Hans Henrik Dahl as Kjeld
 Dorte Bjørndal as Hanne
 Knud Schrøder as Fars direktør
 Carl Johan Hviid as Overbetjenten
 Bjørn Spiro as Hundeejer Jensen
 Hardy Rafn as Kalle
 Børge Møller Grimstrup as Købmanden

External links

1956 films
1950s Danish-language films
Films directed by Alice O'Fredericks
Films scored by Sven Gyldmark
ASA Filmudlejning films
Father of Four